HNoMS Otto Sverdrup is a Fridtjof Nansen-class frigate of the Royal Norwegian Navy.

Construction and commissioning
Built by the Spanish shipbuilders Navantia, in Ferrol, Otto Sverdrup was the third of the Fridtjof Nansen class to be launched and then commissioned into the Royal Norwegian Navy.

Service
In November 2017 Otto Sverdrup visited London's West India Dock with the Portuguese frigate Francisco de Almeida. Both ships were part of Standing NATO Maritime Group 1 at the time. The current Captain of the Otto Sverdrup is Captain Iris Fivelstad.

References

External links
 - Royal Norwegian Navy's page on the Fridtjof Nansen class

Frigates of Norway
Fridtjof Nansen-class frigates
2006 ships
Ships built in Spain